Kristiyan Grigorov (Bulgarian: Кристиян Григоров; born 27 October 1990) is a Bulgarian footballer who plays as a centre-back for Levski Lom.

Career

Ludogorets Razgrad
On 28 May 2017 he complete his debut for the first team in the First League, scoring one of the goals for the 3:1 win over Cherno More.

Botev Vratsa
On 13 June 2017, Grigorov joined Botev Vratsa.  He left the club at the end of the 2017–18 season when his contract expired.

Kariana
On 26 July 2018, Grigorov signed with Kariana.

References

External links
 

1990 births
Living people
Bulgarian footballers
First Professional Football League (Bulgaria) players
Second Professional Football League (Bulgaria) players
PFC Belite Orli Pleven players
PFC Spartak Pleven players
FC Dunav Ruse players
PFC Ludogorets Razgrad II players
PFC Ludogorets Razgrad players
FC Botev Vratsa players
FC Kariana Erden players
PFC Dobrudzha Dobrich players
Association football central defenders
Sportspeople from Pleven